Pendeen Lighthouse, also known as Pendeen Watch is an active aid to navigation located  to the north of Pendeen in west Cornwall, England. It is located within the Aire Point to Carrick Du SSSI, the Cornwall Area of Outstanding Natural Beauty and the Penwith Heritage Coast. The South West Coast Path passes to the south.

Layout

Attached to the tower itself, there is an 'E' shaped building split into a terrace of four cottages. Three of the cottages were originally used to house the three resident keepers, their wives and families, with the fourth used as an office area and sleeping accommodation for the supernumerary keepers. They are now let as holiday cottages. Water was originally collected off the flat roof of the accommodation block and stored in an underground tank. Behind the cottages are three kitchen gardens (which soon fell into disuse as nothing would grow in such an exposed position). On the seaward side of the complex, the fog siren and its accompanying machinery is housed in a separate building.

Significance
The lighthouse, together with the attached keepers' cottages, are Grade II listed, as is the separate engine house (with its fog horn equipment), along with other associated buildings and the boundary walls. Pendeen's engine house is 'the only example in the country to have retained its 12" siren with associated machinery'.

Construction
Trinity House decided to build a lighthouse and foghorn here in 1891 and the building was designed by their engineer Sir Thomas Matthews. The  tower, buildings and surrounding wall were constructed by Arthur Carkeek of Redruth who had to flatten the headland before building could commence. The light was first lit on 3 October 1900.

Lamp and optic
A five–wick Argand lamp was initially provided, by Messrs Chance of Smethwick, near Birmingham; it was replaced not long afterwards, however, by a Matthews 3-50mm dia. mantle lamp. (The original Argand oil lamp was on display at the Trinity House National Lighthouse Museum, Penzance, until 2005 when the museum closed.)

Fog siren
The fog signal was sounded from a detached engine house a little to the north-west. In 1900 it contained a pair of Hornsby oil engines providing compressed air for the twin 5-inch sirens, which sounded a seven-second blast every one-and-a-half minutes, through vertical curved trumpets (still in place) on the engine room roof.

Electrification
In 1926 Pendeen was the first Trinity House station to be fitted with a new, more powerful 12-inch siren. This was part of a general upgrade to the lighthouse, which saw new Gardner semi-diesel engines installed in the engine house and an electric filament lamp replacing the petroleum vapour light in the lantern. Pendeen was one of the first Trinity House lighthouses to be equipped with an incandescent light bulb: 'in order to obviate a watch being kept during fog both in the engine room and the lantern, electric light has been introduced in place of the petroleum-vapour lamps and the apparatus in the lantern made automatic'. The electric current was generated by dynamos directly coupled to another set of semi-diesel engines. The lamp used was an Osram gas-filled bulb, specially designed for Trinity House by the General Electric Company. The automated equipment included a turntable lamp changer: in the event of a lamp failure, a reserve bulb was brought into position and lit (and an alarm notified the keeper), and if the reserve bulb then failed, it was replaced by a self-lighting acetylene lamp; the system remained in use until the mid-1990s.

In the engine house, the Gardners were replaced by a pair of Ruston & Hornsby diesels in 1963.

Automation
Pendeen Lighthouse was automated in 1995 with the keepers leaving the station on 3 May. While a new electric lamp and automatic lamp changer were provided at this time, the original optic was retained and it remains in use. As part of the preparation for automation the fog siren was decommissioned and replaced with an electric fog signal, sounding once every 20 seconds; (The fog signal was decommissioned in April 2014).

Gallery

See also

 List of lighthouses in England

References

External links
 Pendeen Lighthouse at Trinity House
 Photographs and Information from Strolling Guides

Grade II listed lighthouses
Grade II listed buildings in Cornwall
Lighthouses completed in 1900
Lighthouses in Cornwall
St Just in Penwith
1900 establishments in England